The final of the Women's High Jump event at the 2003 Pan American Games took place on Friday August 8, 2003.

Medalists

Records

Results

See also
2003 World Championships in Athletics – Women's high jump
2003 High Jump Year Ranking
Athletics at the 2004 Summer Olympics – Women's high jump

Notes

References
Results

High Jump, Women
2003
2003 in women's athletics